Time of the Wolf is a 2003 French dystopian post-apocalyptic drama film written and directed by Austrian filmmaker Michael Haneke. Set in France at an undisclosed time, the plot follows the story of a family: Georges (Daniel Duval), Anne (Isabelle Huppert), and their two children, Eva (Anaïs Demoustier) and Ben (Lucas Biscombe). The film also stars Olivier Gourmet and Serge Riaboukine.

The film takes its title from Völuspá, an ancient Norse poem which describes the time before the Ragnarök. It received positive reviews.

Plot
A disaster of some type has occurred, of which the audience only knows that uncontaminated water is scarce, and livestock has to be burned. Having fled Paris, the Laurent family arrives at their country home, hoping to find refuge and security, only to discover that it is already occupied by strangers.

The family is assaulted by the strangers and forced to leave, with no supplies or transport. As they seek help from people they have known in the village, they are repeatedly turned away. The family makes its way to a train station where they wait with other survivors, in the hope that a train will stop for them and take them back to the city.

Cast
Isabelle Huppert as Anne Laurent
Daniel Duval as Georges Laurent
Béatrice Dalle as Lise Brandt
Patrice Chéreau as Thomas Brandt
Rona Hartner as Arina
Maurice Bénichou as M. Azoulay
Olivier Gourmet as Koslowski
Brigitte Roüan as Béa
Anaïs Demoustier as Eva
Serge Riaboukine as The leader
Lucas Biscombe as Ben
Marilyne Even as Mme Azoulay
Florence Loiret Caille as Nathalie Azoulay
Michaël Abiteboul as The Armed man

Release
Time of the Wolf was screened in the 2003 Cannes Film Festival, out of competition. Patrice Chéreau, a member of that year's jury, stars in the film, which made the film ineligible for any award. The film also screened at the Sitges Film Festival where it won Best Screenplay and was in the running for Best Film. The film was released on DVD in 2004, and included a film trailer and brief biographies of the lead cast, besides the film.

Critical response
On review aggregator Rotten Tomatoes, Time of the Wolf holds an approval rating of 64%, based on 56 reviews, and an average rating of 6.2/10. Its consensus reads, "A lean and  thriller." On Metacritic, the film has a weighted average score of 71 out of 100, based on 20 critics, indicating "Generally favorable reviews". Peter Bradshaw of The Guardian gave Time of the Wolf 4 out of 5, while Ed Gonzalez of Slant Magazine gave it 3 out of 4.

Desson Thomson of The Washington Post commented that "[he] would rather have a more interesting group of desperate people to spend my post-apocalyptic time with" while A.O. Scott of The New York Times said that "You can feel frightened and disturbed by this movie without being especially moved by it". According to Scott Foundas of the Variety Magazine, "Haneke demonstrates profound insight into the essence of human behavior when all humility is pared away, raw panic and despair are the order of the day, and man becomes more like wolf than man."

William Thomas of the Empire Online gave the film 2 out of 5, saying in his closing comments that "A superb European cast is wasted on a portrait of social breakdown that really has very little to say for itself".

References

External links
 (France)
 (US)

2000s science fiction drama films
German science fiction drama films
German post-apocalyptic films
2000s French-language films
French science fiction drama films
2000s Romanian-language films
Films directed by Michael Haneke
Dystopian films
Films set in France
Films shot in Austria
Films shot in Vienna
French post-apocalyptic films
Films produced by Margaret Ménégoz
Austrian science fiction drama films
2003 drama films
2003 films
2000s French films
2000s German films
2003 multilingual films
Austrian multilingual films
French multilingual films
German multilingual films